Dalquest's pocket mouse (Chaetodipus dalquesti) is a species of rodent in the family Heteromyidae, sometimes viewed as a subspecies of Chaetodipus ammophilus. It is endemic to Mexico. The pocket mouse is named after Walter W. Dalquest (1917-2000), an American zoologist associated with the American Museum of Natural History and Harvard's Museum of Comparative Zoology.

References

Dalquest's Pocket Mouse
Endemic fauna of the Baja California Peninsula
Endemic mammals of Mexico
Mammals described in 1976
Taxobox binomials not recognized by IUCN